"The Wurlitzer Prize (I Don't Want to Get Over You)" is a song written by Chips Moman and Bobby Emmons, and recorded by American country music artist Waylon Jennings.  It was released in September 1977 as the first single from the album Waylon & Willie.  The song was Jennings' sixth number one on the country charts.  The single spent two weeks at the top and a total of eleven weeks on the chart. It was later covered by Kacey Musgraves for a tribute show to Jennings, the live album of which was released in 2017.

Chart performance

References
 

1977 singles
Songs written by Chips Moman
Waylon Jennings songs
Kacey Musgraves
RCA Records singles
Songs written by Bobby Emmons
1977 songs